La voce del padrone was the Italian label for the His Master's Voice recording house. The house belonged to The Gramophone Company Ltd., of Hayes (Middlesex, United Kingdom) which owned several labels in Italy, like Columbia, Marconiphone, Angel Records and Grammofono.

From 1904, Gramophone Company records were published and distributed in Italy by Saif (Società Anonima Italiana di Fonotopia), a company based in Milan. When the Gramophone Company and the Columbia Graphophone Company merged in 1931 to form EMI,  Saif in turn merged with  Columbia's Italian arm, SNG (Società Nazionale del Grammofono).

See also
 List of international HMV operations

Italian record labels